Derek Panter was an English footballer, who played as an inside forward in the Football League for Manchester City and Torquay United.

He made a solitary appearance for Mossley after signing from Oswestry Town in the 1967–68 season before moving to Hyde United for the next two seasons.

References

1943 births
2013 deaths
Sportspeople from Blackpool
English footballers
Association football inside forwards
West Bromwich Albion F.C. players
Manchester City F.C. players
Torquay United F.C. players
Oswestry Town F.C. players
English Football League players
Mossley A.F.C. players
Hyde United F.C. players